SV Dynamo or simply Dynamo, is a Dutch professional men's volleyball club based in Apeldoorn. They compete in the Dutch Eredivisie.

Honours

Domestic
 Dutch Eredivisie
Winners (14): 1990–91, 1992–93, 1993–94, 1994–95, 1995–96, 1996–97, 1998–99, 2000–01, 2002–03, 2006–07, 2007–08, 2009–10, 2020–21, 2021–22

 Dutch Cup
Winners (10): 1992–93, 1993–94, 1995–96, 1999–2000, 2001–02, 2007–08, 2008–09, 2009–10, 2010–11, 2018–19

 Dutch SuperCup
Winners (9): 1993–94, 1995–96, 1996–97, 2000–01, 2001–02, 2007–08, 2008–09, 2010–11, 2021–22

International
 CEV Cup
Winners (1): 2002–03

References

External links
 Official website 

Dutch volleyball clubs
Volleyball clubs established in 1967
1967 establishments in the Netherlands